Anna "Ans" Dresden-Polak (née Anna Polak) (24 November 1906 – 23 July 1943) was a Jewish Dutch gymnast.

She won the gold medal as a member of the Dutch gymnastics team at the 1928 Summer Olympics, in her native Amsterdam. She was one of five Jewish members of the team, which included Stella Blits-Agsteribbe (who was murdered in Auschwitz), Lea Kloot-Nordheim (who was murdered in Sobibor), and Judikje Themans-Simons (who was murdered in Sobibor). Their coach, Gerrit Kleerekoper, was murdered in Sobibor as well.

She was born in Amsterdam, and was murdered in Sobibor extermination camp. From Westerbork concentration camp, she had been deported to Sobibór, where she was murdered on 23 July 1943, together with her six-year-old daughter Eva.  Her husband, Barend Dresden was murdered a few months later in 1944 in Auschwitz concentration camp.

She was inducted into the International Jewish Sports Hall of Fame in 1997.

See also
List of select Jewish gymnasts

References

Further reading

External links
 profile
 Anna Dresden-Polak commemoration, Yad Vashem website

1906 births
1943 deaths
Dutch female artistic gymnasts
Gymnasts at the 1928 Summer Olympics
Jewish gymnasts
Jewish Dutch sportspeople
Olympic gold medalists for the Netherlands
Olympic gymnasts of the Netherlands
Gymnasts from Amsterdam
Dutch people who died in Sobibor extermination camp
Dutch civilians killed in World War II
Dutch Jews who died in the Holocaust
International Jewish Sports Hall of Fame inductees
Medalists at the 1928 Summer Olympics
Olympic medalists in gymnastics
20th-century Dutch women